Zeoke may refer to the following places in Serbia:

Zeoke (Lazarevac), a village in the municipality of Lazarevac
Zeoke (Lučani), a village in the municipality of Lučani